Pioneerville is an unincorporated community located in Boise County, Idaho, United States.

References

	

Unincorporated communities in Boise County, Idaho
Unincorporated communities in Idaho